The Central Court is the supreme court and the highest organ in the judiciary of North Korea.

The Court is accountable to the Supreme People's Assembly (SPA). The SPA elects its justices, and the SPA Standing Committee elects its chief justices and jurors.

Normally, the Central Court serves as the highest appellate court in North Korea, but in certain legal cases it is the court of first instance. These cases include crimes against the state. When it is the court of first instance, the court's decision is always final and cannot be appealed or challenged, which is considered an impediment on the right to a fair trial. Trials of foreigners are always held in the Central Court. A probable reason for this is to decide such cases quickly.

The Central Court has separate chambers for criminal, civil, and special matters.

Tasks and organization
As the supreme court of North Korea, the Central Court it is the highest organ of the judiciary of the country.

It does not exercise the power of judicial review over the constitutionality of executive or legislative actions nor does it have an activist role in protecting the constitutionally guaranteed rights of individuals against state actions. Instead, these powers are exercised by the Standing Committee of the Supreme People's Assembly, which is dominated by Korean Workers' Party and has never ruled a law unconstitutional.

Its task is to supervise all lower courts in the country, including their trials and proceedings, as well as the training of judges. The Supreme Court also appoints and recalls judges of the special courts (that is, the Military Court and the Traffic and Transportation Court that serves railway and waterways).

The Supreme Court is accountable to the Supreme People's Assembly (SPA), and when the latter is in recess, to its Standing Committee.

The court was initially called the Supreme Court, but later renamed the Central Court. The 2012 Kim Il-sung–Kim Jong-il Constitution restored the Supreme Court as its name, until a SPA session reverted to the name Central Court in 2016. The court is based in the capital Pyongyang.

Justices
The Supreme Court is staffed by a chief judge or president, two associate chief judges or vice presidents, and an unknown number of regular judges.

The president and justices are elected and serve for five years. The SPA also elects, and can recall, the head of the court. The Presidium of the SPA elects other judges of the court, as well as its jurors.

President
The president is Choe Kun-yong. The first vice-president is Kim Hwan, who replaced Yun Myong-guk. The other two current vice presidents are Choe Ryong-song and Kim Chong-du. Previous vice presidents have included Choe Yong-song and Hyon Hong-sam.

The current president Kang Yun-sok replaced Pak Myong-chol, who had held the post since 2014. Pak was preceded by Kim Pyong-ryul, appointed in 1998, and re-elected in 2003. Before him, Pang Hak-se had been the president between 1972 and his death in July 1992.

Decisions
The Supreme Court has three chambers: one for criminal, civil, and special matters.

Normally, the Supreme Court is the highest appellate court in the country, for both criminal and civil law cases. For some cases, for example, crimes against the state, it is the court of first instance. When the Supreme Court is the court of first instance, its decision is always final and cannot be appealed or challenged. This is considered an impediment on the right to a fair trial, of which the right to appeal is part of.

The Supreme Court participates in the sentencing of political criminals. The State Security Department can determine sentences for political offenders in the name of the court. For offenders of the Criminal Law of North Korea, the Supreme Court has recommended capital punishment. Summary and arbitrary executions outside the procedure involving the Supreme Court take place in the country, too, sometimes with torture leading up to a confession.

Trials of foreigners are always taken directly to the Supreme Court. This is true despite the fact that crimes against the nation and people, which foreigners are usually accused of, should, according to the Criminal Procedure Law of North Korea, be tried at local-level courts first. The decision to take foreigners to the Supreme Court seems to have been taken to make such trials speedy. Trials of foreigners have involved Americans detained in North Korea such as Aijalon Gomes, Euna Lee, Laura Ling, and Kenneth Bae.

The Supreme Court also arbitrates matters involving the non-fulfillment of contracts between state enterprises and cases involving injuries and compensation demands. These administrative decisions always reflect party policies.

The Supreme Procurator's Office routinely investigates the Supreme Court's decisions. If it finds fault with the Court's decision, it can refer it to a plenary of the Court, in which the country's chief procurator acts as a statutory member. If judges of the Supreme Court hand out "unjust sentences", they can be held liable for it.

See also

 Constitution of North Korea
 Human rights in North Korea
 Judiciary of North Korea
 Law of North Korea
 Law enforcement in North Korea
 Politics of North Korea
 Supreme Court of Korea
 Constitutional Court of Korea

References

Works cited

External links
Photos at Minjok Tongshin
Exclusive: Inside the N. Korean court that tried Kenneth Bae at NK News
Section 8., The Public Prosecutors Office and the Court, of the North Korean Constitution at Naenara

Law of North Korea
Korea, North
Courts and tribunals with year of establishment missing